The 2011 Australian Swift Series was the second running of the series. It was based around seven rounds in four different states. The season featured drivers like former 1987 Bathurst 1000 winner Peter McLeod and his son, former V8 Supercar competitor Ryan McLeod. Former V8 Utes driver Rob Jarvis, joined by his speedway driving son Allan, were regulars. Production Car racers Richard Mork, BJ Cook and New Zealanders Rex McCutcheon and Mark Gibson made appearances throughout the season. The final round was taken out by two time Australian Formula Vee National winner Ryan Simpson.

Calendar
The 2011 Australian Swift Series was contested over seven rounds, starting at Mallala in May and finishing at Eastern Creek in December.

Driver standings

References

External links
 Official Web Page
 Shannons Nationals Web Page
 2011 Technical & Sporting regulations – CAMS Manual

Swift Series